Anti-Russian violence in Chechnya refers to acts of violence that were recorded against Russian and non-Chechen civilians in Chechnya from 1991 to 1994, which resulted in tens of thousands of ethnic Russians leaving or being expelled from the republic. Chechen separatists declared independence in 1991 as part of the disintegration of the Soviet Union before the First Chechen War began in 1994.

Background 
Russian commentators have described the animosity between Chechens and Russians as a conflict that has persisted since Russia's attempts to consolidate the territory into its empire in the 18th century.

The All-Union Census of 1989 recorded 1,270,429 residents of Checheno-Ingush ASSR, including 734,501 Chechens, 293,771 Russians, 163,762 Ingushes, 14,824 Armenians, 14,824 Tatars, and 12,637 Nogai people. The population of Chechnya was 1,100,000 residents, including the 397,000 people from Grozny (210,000 Russians).

The migration of Russians from Checheno-Ingush ASSR was going on in the 1980s with their numbers dropping by 12.6% between 1979 and 1989.

According to a 2006 report published by the Moscow Helsinki Group, while many former Soviet republics saw the mass emigration of Russian speakers to Russia, this emigration was spurred only in Chechnya by anti-Russian sentiments and the threat of violence. Local Chechen attitudes increasingly blamed Russia for their economic and political troubles and viewed ethnic Russians as hostile "colonizers" of Chechnya.

Anti-Russian violence in 1991-1994 

As the USSR was disintegrating, the economic situation in Chechnya rapidly deteriorated and the civil order broker down.
After coming to the power in late 1991 Dudayev began the construction of an "autocratic Chechen state." Dudayev's government armed male Chechens in late 1991 and early 1992 which contributed to abuses against non-Chechens. Many Chechens who could not find work in Chechnya and lost their seasonal work in Russia turned against Russians and other non-Chechens who did not have the benefit of kin protection. The attacks included physical violence, robberies and "routine humiliations."  Some Russian homes were directly seized.

Ethnic Russians were removed from the economic administration and the organs of judicial and legislative power. The local Communist Party official Vitaly Kutsenko became among the first casualties of the anti-Russian violence when he was assaulted by supporters of Dudayev and members of National Congress of Chechen People. Conflicting reports allege that either Kutsenko was thrown out of a window of his office, or died from falling after trying to escape out a window.  According to Russian political commentators, the lack of action from the Soviet government in response to this assault further emboldened Chechen forces to carry out violence against Russians. Many other leading representatives of the Russian-language population were murdered, including the university rector Kan-Kalik, dean Udodov, judge Samsonova, cabinet of ministers employee Sanko and journalist Krikoryants.

From June 1990 to June 1991 20,000 Russians and other non-Chechens left Chechnya while in the next year 50,000 moved out. Overall, about one-third of Russians who lived in Chechnya were expelled in 1991-1992.

According to Izvestiya, Russian persecution began in the 1990s, starting with threatening letters telling Russians to leave in 1990, followed by the disappearances of Russian girls and reports of Russian men being assaulted. Russian government officials described the events as a genocide and described various anti-Russian slogans attributed to Chechens which called for the expulsion and/or enslavement of Russians.

The residents of Assinovskaya, Sunzhensky District, Chechnya, sent an open letter to the Russian president Boris Yeltsin, in which they named all the cases of assaults on Russian people and murders of them. The letter stated that 26 Russian families had been murdered since August 1996, and more than 52 households were kidnapped by the Chechen forces. Another appeal made by 50 thousand residents of Naursky and Shelkovsky Districts was mentioned in a book published by Rosinformcenter.

People fleeing Chechnya could not get refugee status because, according to Russian laws, the refugee status was only offered for migration to another country; those people were considered "internally displaced persons".

Reactions

Official reaction
On 17 June 1993, the Council of Nations of Supreme Soviet of Russia adopted the statement "Due to the situation in the Chechen Republic", in which it was stated that the policy of the Chechen authorities led to "serious deterioration of different nations", some of whose people "[were] expelled over the borders of the republic and have to leave places, where they and their ancestors had been living together with Chechens and Ingushes for many generations". In October 1994 Dudayev claimed during an interview with Interfax that reports of persecution of non-Chechen people in Ichkeriya were simply Russian propaganda, and highlighted proclamations made by his government against the persecution of Russians.

The Russian MVD and Prosecutor General officials stated that Russian and Chechen Internal Affairs Sections did not sign any agreements on functions distinction between two sides, so all crimes committed on Chechen territory had to be investigated by Chechnya law agencies.

In July 2000 Russian president Vladimir Putin said, "Last  we saw [a] large-scale genocide of Russian nation and Russian-speaking population in Chechnya. Unfortunately, nobody dared to move a muscle after that". At the meeting with Chechen community representatives in 2002, Putin noted that Aslan Maskhadov's reign was arranged in Chechnya, and claimed that it led to genocide against other nations, total collapse of social and spiritual areas of life, economic collapse, and hunger.

In 2006, Chechen Republic Prime Minister Deputy Ziyad Sabsabi denied enabling genocide against Russians in Ichkeriya in 1992 and 1993 and stated

Accounts of the suffering of the Russian-speaking population of Chechnya were sometimes intentionally exaggerated by the Russian intelligence services who sought to undermine Dudayev in 1991-1994.

Criminal prosecution 

On 1 February 1995 a criminal case was opened by Prosecutor General of Russia against Dudayev who was accused of stoking inter-ethnic hatred.

Putin's statement on human rights violations during counter-terrorism operations in the Northern Caucasus region of Russia pledged a quick investigation into genocide in Chechnya cases and placed responsibility for these and other crimes on criminal "Dudayev – Maskhadov regime".

In 2001 Chechen Ramzes Goychaev was accused by the court of Russians genocide in Chechnya in 1997-1999 (Article 357 of Russian Criminal Code). According to information from prosecutors, Goychaev's gang murdered 10 Russian people in Chervlyonnaya (Shelkovsky District, Republic of Chechnya). The court did not find Goyachev guilty of genocide because genocide was understood to be "the crime against world and humanity safety". However, several murders were enough reason to sentence Goychaev to the death penalty before being commuted to a life sentence.

Human rights organisations 
Some Russian human rights activists state that crimes against civilians on territories not controlled by Russian Armed Forces went unpunished. Also, the 1086 PACE Resolution condemned the capture of positions near civilian settlements by Chechen armed detachments without preliminary warning of civilians on evacuation necessity. All similar crimes of illegal armed groups are included in books published by Memorial, however, authors state that the description of crimes by media is overblown.

Number of victims  

About 90,000 Russians and other non-Chechens were expelled or forced to leave in 1991-1992.

In July 1999 the Russian Ministry of Nations Affairs said that in the nine years since 1991, more than 21,000 Russian civilians lost their lives. At least 100 thousand lost their homes, and were destroyed or commandeered by native civilians. At least 46,000 individuals became de facto slaves.

According to historic population data, there were 269,130 Russians in Checheno-Ingush ASSR in 1989 (24.8%) and there were 24,382 Russians in Chechen Republic of Russian Federation in 2010 (1.9%).

References

Literature 
 
 
 
 
 
 
 
  (original name of book is "Grozny Novel" — «Грозненский роман»)

External links 

Anti-Russian sentiment
Chechen Republic of Ichkeria
Chechen–Russian conflict
Human rights abuses in Russia
Ethnic persecution